Obrist is a surname. Notable people with the surname include:

Christian Obrist (born 1980), Italian middle-distance runner
Christine Egerszegi-Obris (born 1948), Swiss politician
Franz Obrist, Italian luger
Hans-Ulrich Obrist (born 1968), Swiss curator, critic and historian of art
Hermann Obrist (1862–1927), German sculptor of the Jugendstil

See also
Hans-Ulrich Obrist bibliography, bibliography for Hans-Ulrich Obrist

References